Aramais Yepiskoposyan (born 27 September 1968) is a former Armenian professional football player. He also holds Russian citizenship.

Honours
 Kazakhstan Premier League champion: 1999.

External links
 
 

1968 births
Living people
Soviet footballers
Armenian footballers
Armenia international footballers
Armenian expatriate footballers
Expatriate footballers in Kazakhstan
FC Ararat Yerevan players
FC Chernomorets Novorossiysk players
Russian Premier League players
FC Kuban Krasnodar players
FC Irtysh Pavlodar players
Armenian expatriate sportspeople in Kazakhstan
Association football midfielders
FC Spartak-UGP Anapa players
Soviet Armenians
Soviet Top League players